Guru (Marathi: गुरू) is a 2016 Marathi language action film directed by Sanjay Jadhav and produced by Sunil Lulla, Deepak Pandurang Rane and Bagpiper Soda. The film stars Ankush Choudhary and Urmila Kanitkar in lead roles. Film marks the fourth collaboration of actor-director duo Ankush Choudhary and Sanjay Jadhav and first after their blockbuster outing Duniyadari. The film released on 22 January 2016.

Film is a one of a kind content partnership between United Spirits' Bagpiper Soda and Eros International. Through a unique association, Bagpiper Soda will be an integrated partner across the film's content, promotions and performance.

Official teaser of the film is released on 18 November 2015. First official poster of the film designed by Sachin Gurav was unveiled in an event while official trailer went online on 30 December.

Plot
Guru – A young and smart smalltime conman, earns his livelihood by manipulating rich people but is also the king of hearts in his neighborhood. However, one fine day, he happens to witness a murder and get trapped in scandal, Guru returns to his village to get away from the scandal. The villagers of his native place are under the threat of being forcefully evicted to make way for a 'Mega City' being planned on their land. A local advocate, along with Guru's brother, vehemently oppose this project and firmly stand in the way of it. The murder he witnessed is part of a larger conspiracy which follows him and has connection with his village which threatens to endanger him, as well as his loved ones. With his brother seriously injured and his newfound sweetheart  in considerable danger, how guru overcomes this situations forms rest of the story.

Cast
Ankush Choudhary as Guru Desai
Urmilla Kothare as Mango Dolly aka Ovi
Murali Sharma as Mansingh
Avinash Narkar as Madhav Desai
Ravindra Mankani
Sneha Raikar
Jyoti Chandekar
Vicky Mokal
Chandrakant Yadav as Nagesh

Soundtrack

Amitraj, Pankaj Padghan and Praful Karlekar composed the music for this film. Kshitij Patwardhan, Mandar Cholkar, Sachin Pathak wrote lyrics for the film. Title song from the movie composed by Amitraj written by Sachin Pathak and sung by Adarsh Shinde was released on 22 December 2015.

Release
Film had a theatrical release on 22 January 2016. Ankush was praised for his action role. The film earned positive reviews. Abp Maza gave 3.5* and india.com gave 4*.

References

External links

2010s Marathi-language films